Fjellsrud is a village in the municipality of Fet, Norway. Its population (2005) is 438.

Villages in Akershus